Gibbula houarti is a species of sea snail, a marine gastropod mollusk in the family Trochidae, the top snails.

Description
The size of the shell varies between 6 mm and 13 mm.

Distribution
This marine species occurs off the Philippines.

References

External links
 

houarti
Gastropods described in 2006